List of flags of Georgia may refer to:
List of flags of Georgia (country)
Flag of Georgia (U.S. state)#History